Rahul Sipligunj (born 22 August 1989) is an Indian playback singer, songwriter, independent musician and actor. He became popular with his independent songs on YouTube. He is known for his Telangana Telugu or Hyderabad Telugu songs. He has worked as a singer in over 50 Telugu-language films.

Career

As independent artist
He started his career with online music videos on YouTube. He co-produced, wrote and sang songs like "Magajaathi", "Em Maayaloo", "Mangamma", "Makikirikiri", "Poor boy", "Daawath", "Galli Ka Ganesh", "Doorame", "Jai Bajrang", "Hijra".  Most of his music videos were hits but among these videos, "Makikirikiri" & "Galli ka Ganesh" were Huge hits songs.

Tollywood
His first song was "College bulloda" in the movie  Josh at the age of 20 in 2009. He became popular in Tollywood with his songs like "Vaastu Bagunde" in Dammu, "Singareni Undi" in Racha. He also sang Spanish part in the song "Melikalu" in Cameraman Gangatho Rambabu, "Prema Katha Chitram Title song" in Prema Katha Chitram, "You are My Darlingo" in Jakkana, "O Alekhya O Alekhya" in Doosukeltha, "Peddha Puli" in Chal Mohan Ranga. He sang the most popular song "Ranga Ranga Rangasthalana" from the movie Rangasthalam. He sang another popular song "Bonalu" from the movie iSmart Shankar.

He is best known in the west for his work with M.M. Keeravani on the soundtrack for the 2022 film RRR. Sipligunj and Kaala Bhairava performed the Oscar-winning song "Naatu Naatu" at the 95th Academy Awards on 12 March 2023.

Television

Filmography

Discography

Non-film songs

Music videos

Singles

Film songs

References

External links

5. He co-singed a song called " Naatu Naatu " with singer Kaala Bhairava from the Movie" RRR " won the 80th golden globe award, and a first ever Indian song to own the award and won The Oscars for Best Original Song 

Living people
Indian male playback singers
Singers from Telangana
Telugu playback singers
1989 births
Bigg Boss (Telugu TV series)